La Voyageuse (foaled 1975 in Ontario) is a Canadian Thoroughbred racehorse who was a three-time Sovereign Award winner. She was bred and raced by prominent Quebec businessman and major racing stable owner Jean-Louis Levesque.

Retired to broodmare duty for the 1981 season, La Voyageuse produced thirteen foals between then and 1997. One of her daughters, Society Lady (1990), produced the European Champion Two-Year-Old Filly, Bint Allayl.

La Voyageuse was inducted into the Canadian Horse Racing Hall of Fame on August 27, 2009.

References
 La Voyageuse's pedigree and partial racing stats
 https://web.archive.org/web/20090214202204/http://canadianhorseracinghalloffame.com/events/index.cfm#22

1975 racehorse births
Racehorses bred in Ontario
Racehorses trained in Canada
Sovereign Award winners
Thoroughbred family 4-g